Kani Siv (also Romanized as Kānī Sīv; also known as Kānī Sīb) is a village in Baryaji Rural District, in the Central District of Sardasht County, West Azerbaijan Province, Iran. At the 2006 census, its population was 88, in 20 families.

References 

Populated places in Sardasht County